Walter Wellbrock (December 2, 1893 – November 24, 1944) was an American farmer and politician.

Wellbrock was born on a farm in Otter Tail County, Minnesota and was a farmer. He lived in Fergus Falls, Minnesota with his wife and family. He served in the Minnesota House of Representatives from 1943 until his death in 1944. He had been re-elected in 1944 to the Minnesota legislature before his death. He died in Otter Tail County, Minnesota.

References

1893 births
1944 deaths
People from Fergus Falls, Minnesota
Farmers from Minnesota
Members of the Minnesota House of Representatives